This list records each International Day of Yoga from the day's inception in 2015.

2015 

The first International Day of Yoga was observed around the world on June 21 2015. The Ministry of AYUSH made the necessary arrangements in India. 35,985 people, including Narendra Modi and dignitaries from 84 nations, performed 21 asanas (yoga postures) for 35 minutes at Rajpath in New Delhi. The day was observed by millions across the world. NCC cadets entered the Limca Book of Records for the "largest yoga performance simultaneously by a single uniformed youth organization" by performing at multiple venues.

The event at Rajpath established two Guinness world records awarded to the Ministry of AYUSH, and received by the minister Shripad Yesso Naik. They were for the largest yoga class, of 35,985 people, and for the largest number of participating nationalities (84 nations). In San Francisco, 5,000 participants gathered in the Marina Green park to do yoga.

2016 

A senior government official said, "The government of India has decided to take forward the momentum created by the International Day of Yoga, 2015 with more and more active participation of youth during the current year's celebrations." The ministry organized an event titled "The National Event of Mass Yoga Demonstration" at Chandigarh, which was to be attended by the Indian Prime Minister.

India's Permanent Mission to the UN organized celebrations at the United Nations on June 20 and 21 2016. A special event titled "Conversation with Yoga Masters – Yoga for the achievement of the Sustainable Development Goals" was the centerpiece. Jaggi Vasudev was the main speaker at the event.

2017 

In Lucknow, the Indian prime minister Narendra Modi participated in the event and practiced yoga along with 51,000 participants. Many business leaders in India also took part in the event. In New York, thousands of participants gathered to practice yoga on Times Square. Japan created a Parliamentary League for the promotion of yoga just prior to the event, in April 2017. In China, the largest gathering was 10,000 participants in the city of Wuxi. In Athens, the event took place on 25 June as part of the Greek Open Yoga Day and in Kyiv, the event happened on 18 June and gathered a few hundred participants. In Ireland, participants met in the round room of the City Hall in Dublin. The theme for 2017 was "Yoga for Health".

2018

The event in Dehradun was held at the Forest Research Institute. PM Modi led an estimated 50,000 volunteers to mark the fourth anniversary of International Yoga Day. The theme for 2018 was "Yoga for Peace". Over 100,000 people gathered at a yoga session in Kota, Rajasthan and performed yoga together, earning the city a Guinness World Record.

2019

The 5th International Yoga Day was celebrated zealously in various parts of India, but the main event was held in Ranchi and the prime minister of India, Narendra Modi led a crowd of over 40,000 people, who attended this event there. The theme of that year's event was "Yoga for Heart". At this event, the prime minister addressed the people of India, stressing on the importance of Yoga for the overall health of body, mind, society, and even our climate, saying "Let our motto be - Yoga for peace, harmony, and progress". He also said that the government would be working to make Yoga a pillar of the 'preventive healthcare and wellness' system.

2020

The theme for the 2020 day was "Yoga at Home and Yoga with the Family". The Bulgarian prime minister Boyko Borissov recorded a video message to the Indian prime minister Narendra Modi on the occasion.

2021

The theme for the 2021 day was "Yoga for well-being". Because of the COVID-19 pandemic, the Indian mission to the United Nations organized an online celebration on UN WebTV in place of face-to-face yoga events.

2022

The 8th International Yoga Day was celebrated in various parts of India, but the main event was held in Mysore and the prime minister of India, Narendra Modi led a crowd of over 15,000 people in the Mysore Palace Premises, who attended this event there. The theme of the year's event was "Yoga for humanity".

References

Yoga
Religion-related lists
United Nations days
Lists of days